The European Gliding Championships is a gliding competition held every two years.

Gliding is a competitive sport and was even a demonstration sport at the 1936 Summer Olympics. It was due to become an official Olympic sport in the Helsinki Games in 1940.  However, since the war, gliding has not featured in the Olympics. For gliding, international competition has been provided by the World Gliding Championships since 1938 and also by the European Gliding Championships since 1982.

The increased number of classes of glider means that it is no longer possible for all the classes to compete at the same location. The European Glider Aerobatic Championships were added in 1992. They are also held every two years.

European Gliding Championships
Each of the following entries give the year and location of the contest followed by the winner of each class, nationality and the glider used.

 1st Championships – 1982 Rieti, Italy
 Open Class Winner: Klaus Holighaus, West Germany
 15-metre Class Winner: Kees Musters, Netherlands
 Standard Class Winner: Leonardo Brigliadori, Italy
 2nd Championships – 1984 Vinon-sur-Verdon, France
 Open Class Winner: Gerard Lherm, France
 15-metre Class Winner: Delylle, France
 Standard Class Winner: Jean-Claude Lopiteaux, France
 3rd Championships – 1986 Mengen, Germany
 Open Class Winner: Klaus Holighaus, West Germany
 15-metre Class Winner: Daniel M. Pare, Netherlands
 Standard Class Winner: Bruno Gantenbrink, West Germany
 4th Championships – 1988 Räyskälä Airfield, Loppi, Finland
 Open Class Winner: Klaus Holighaus, West Germany
 15-metre Class Winner: Gerard Lherm, France
 Standard Class Winner: Janusz Trzeciak, Poland
 5th Championships – 1990 Leszno, Poland
 Open Class Winner: Eberhard Laur, West Germany 
 15-metre Class Winner: Gabriel Chenevoy, France
 Standard Class Winner: Janusz Trzeciak, Poland
 6th Championships – 1992 Békéscsaba, Hungary
 Open Class Winner: Gerard Lherm, France
 15-metre Class Winner: Gilbert Gerbaud, France
 Standard Class Winner: Franciszek Kepka, Poland
 7th Championships – 1994 Rieti, Italy
 Open Class Winner: Bruno Gantenbrink, Germany
 15-metre Class Winner: Stefano Ghiorzo, Italy 
 Standard Class Winner: Peter Fischer, Germany
 8th Championships – 1996 Räyskälä Airfield, Loppi, Finland
 Open Class Winner: Janusz Centka, Poland, Germany
 15-metre Class Winner: Michael Grund, Germany
 Standard Class Winner: Erwin Ziegler, Germany
 9th Championships – 1998 Leszno, Poland
 Open Class Winner: Ulrich Schwenk, Germany
 15-metre Class Winner: Hans Obermeyer, Germany
 Standard Class Winner: Paul Crabb, Ireland
 10th Championships – 2000 Lüsse, Germany
 Open Class Winner: Bruno Gantenbrink, Germany; Glider: Schempp-Hirth Nimbus-4
 15-metre Class Winner: Steve Jones, UK; Glider: Schempp-Hirth Ventus-2a
 Standard Class Winner: Jean-Marc Caillard, France; Glider: Schempp-Hirth Discus-2a
 11th Championships – 2002 Békéscsaba, Hungary
 Open Class Winner: Tassilo Bode, Germany; Glider: Alexander Schleicher ASW 22 BLE
 18-metre Class Winner: Petr Krejčiřík, Czech Republic; Glider: Schempp-Hirth Ventus-C
 15-metre Class Winner: Frédéric Hoyeau, France; Glider: Alexander Schleicher ASW 27
 Standard Class Winner: Tomáš Suchánek, Czech Republic; Glider: Rolladen-Schneider LS8
 12th Championships – 2004 Pociūnai, Lithuania, Official Website
 Open Class Winner: Russell Cheetham, UK; Glider: Alexander Schleicher ASW 22 BL
 18-metre Class Winner: Wolfgang Janowitsch, Austria; Glider: Schempp-Hirth Ventus-2cx
 15-metre Class Winner: Herbert Zemmel, Germany; Glider: Schempp-Hirth Ventus-2
 Standard Class Winner: Tomasz Rubaj, Poland; Glider: Rolladen-Schneider LS8
 13th Championships – 2005 Nitra, Slovakia Official Website
 Club Class Winner: Sebastian Kawa, Poland; Glider: SZD-48-3M Brawo
 Standard Class Winner: Pavel Loužecký, Czech Republic; Glider: Rolladen-Schneider LS8
 18-metre Class Winner: Wolfgang Janowitsch, Austria; Glider:  Schempp-Hirth Ventus-2CX
 13th Championships – 2005 Räyskälä Airfield, Loppi, Finland, Official Website
 15-metre Class Winner: Steven Raimond, Netherlands; Glider: Alexander Schleicher ASW 27
 Open Class Winner: Peter Harvey, UK; Glider: Schempp-Hirth Nimbus-4T
 14th Championships – 2007 Pociūnai, Lithuania 28 July 2007 – 12 August 2007 Official website
 20 meter Two-Seater Class Winners: Gintautas Butnoris Vytautas Rasimavicius, Lithuania; Glider: Schempp-Hirth Duo Discus
 Club Class Winner: Sebastian Kawa, Poland; Glider: SZD-48-3M Brawo
 Standard Class Winner: Frederic Hoyeau, France; Glider: Rolladen-Schneider LS8
 World Class Winner: Krzysztof Herczynski, Poland; Glider: PZL PW-5
 14th Championships – 2007 Issoudun, France 2 August 2007 – 19 August 2007 Official website
 15 meter Class Winner: Janusz Centka, Poland; Glider: Diana 2
 18 meter Class Winner: Ronald Termaat, Netherlands; Glider: Ventus-2CXT
 Open Class Winner: Peter Harvey, UK; Glider: Schempp-Hirth Nimbus-4T
 15th Championships – 2009 Nitra, Slovakia 27 June 2009 –  11 July 2009 Official website
 15 meter Class Winner: Louis Bouderlique, France; Glider: Ventus-2A
 18 meter Class Winner: Russell Cheetham, UK; Glider: Alexander Schleicher ASG 29
 Open Class Winner: Peter Harvey, UK; Glider: Schempp-Hirth Nimbus-4T
 15th Championships – 2009 Pociūnai, Lithuania 25 July 2009 – 8 August 2009 Official website
 20 meter Two-Seater Class Winners: Janusz Centka/M. Szumski, Poland; Glider Schempp-Hirth Duo DiscusxT
 Club Class Winner: René de Dreu, Netherlands; Glider: LS 1F
 Standard Class Winner: Mario Kiessling, Germany; Glider: Schempp-Hirth Discus-2a
 World Class Winner: Jedrzej Sklodowski, Poland; Glider: PZL PW-5
 16th Championships – 2011 Nitra, Slovakia
 20 meter Two seater Class Winner: Harri Hirvola & Visa Matti Leinikki; Finland; Glider:Schempp-Hirth Arcus
 Club Class Winner: Roman Mraček, Czech Republic; Glider:Schempp-Hirth Standard Cirrus
 Standard Class Winner: Sebastian Kawa, Poland; Glider: Schempp-Hirth Discus-2a
 World Class Winner: Jakub Barszcz, Poland; Glider: PZL PW-5
 16th Championships – 2011 Pociūnai, Lithuania 31 July to 13 August 2011
 15 meter Class Winner: Christophe Ruch, France; Glider: Ventus-2A
 18 meter Class Winner: Karol Staryszak, Poland; Glider: Alexander Schleicher ASG 29
 Open Class Winner: Markus Frank, Germany; Glider: Binder EB29
 17th Championships – 2013 Vinon-sur-Verdon, France 8–21 June 2013
 15 meter Class Winner: Louis Bourderlique, France; Glider: Ventus-2A
 18 meter Class Winner: Sebastian Kawa, Poland; Glider: Alexander Schleicher ASG 29
 Open Class Winner: Michael Sommer, Germany; Glider: Binder EB29
 17th Championships – 2013 Ostrów Wielkopolski, Poland, 5–20 July 2013
 Standard Class: Sebastian Kawa, Poland; Glider: Schempp-Hirth Discus-2a
 Club Class: Roman Mraček, Czech Republic; Glider:Schempp-Hirth Standard Cirrus
 20 meter Multi-seat Class: Wolfgang Janowitsch & Andreas Lutz, Austria; Glider: Schempp-Hirth Arcus M
 18th Championships – 2015, Ocseny, Hungary, 12–25 July 2015, (18m, 20m and Open Classes)
 18 meter Class Winner: Sebastian Kawa, Poland; Glider: Alexander Schleicher ASG 29
 Open Class Winner: Lukasz Wojcik, Poland; Glider: Jonker JS1C
 20 meter Multi-seat Class: Wolfgang Janowitsch & Andreas Lutz, Austria; Glider: Schempp-Hirth Arcus M
 18th Championships – 2015, Rieti, Italy, 2–15 August 2015. (Standard, Club and 15m Classes)
 15 meter Class Winner: Didier Hauss, France; Glider: Ventus-2
 Standard Class: Lukasz Blaszczyk, Poland; Glider: Schempp-Hirth Discus-2a
 Club Class: Ondřej Dvořák, Czech Republic; Glider:Schempp-Hirth Standard Cirrus
 19th Championships – 2017, Lasham Airfield, UK, 23 July – 6 August 2017, (15m, 18m and Open Classes)
 15 meter Class Winner: Freddy Hein, Germany; Glider: Ventus-2ax
 18 meter Class Winner: Wolfgang Janowitsch, Austria; Glider: Schempp-Hirth Ventus-3t
 Open Class Winner: Michael Sommer, Germany; Glider:Binder EB29R
 19th Championships – 2017, Moravská Třebová, Czech Republic, 23 July – 5 August 2017, (Standard, Club and 20m Classes)
 Standard Class Winner: Pavel Loužecký, Czech Republic; Glider: Rolladen-Schneider LS8
 Club Class Winner: Tim Kuijpers, Netherlands; Glider: Schempp-Hirth Standard Cirrus
 20 meter Multi-seat Class Winner: Sebastian Kawa & Christoph Matkowski, Poland; Glider:ASG-32 Mi
 20th Championships – 2019, Turbia, Poland, 12–25 May 2019, (18m, 20m and Open Classes)
 18 meter Class Winner: Sebastian Kawa, Poland; Glider: Diana 3
 Open Class Winner: Petr Tichý, Czech Republic; Glider: Binder EB29R
 20 meter Multi-seat Class: Tomasz Rubaj & Christoph Matkowski, Poland; Glider: ASG-32 Mi
 20th Championships – 2019, Prievidza, Slovakia, 7–20 July 2019, (Standard, Club and 15m Classes)
 Standard Class Winner: Pavel Loužecký, Czech Republic; Glider: LS-8
 Club Class Winner: Tom Arscott, Great Britain; Glider: LS7
 15 meter Class Winner: Sebastian Kawa, Poland; Glider: Diana 2
 21st Championships – 2022, Pociūnai, Lithuania, 3–15 July 2022, (Standard, Club and 15m Classes)
 Standard Class Winner: Jan-Ola Nordh, Sweden; Glider: Schempp-Hirth Discus-2t
 Club Class Winner: Tomáš Suchánek, Czech Republic; Glider: Schleicher ASW 20
 15 meter Class Winner: Sebastian Kawa, Poland; Glider: Diana 2 FES V

European Women's Gliding Championships

1st European Women s Gliding Championships in Hungary 1979
 champion: Monika Warstat (East Germany); runner-up: Eda Laan (UDSSR/Lithuania); placed: Jindra Paluskova (CSSR)

2nd European Women s Gliding Championships in France 1981
 standard class
 15m class

3rd European Women s Gliding Championships in Saint Hubert (Belgium) 1983
(originally supposed to be held in Oryol (UDSSR))
 standard class
 15m class champion: Giesela Weinreich (West Germany)

4th European Women s Gliding Championships in Subotica Yugoslavia 1985
 standard class
 15m class champion: Gisela Weinreich (West Germany); runner-up: Geogeo Litt (Belgium); third place: Maria Kyzivatova

5th European Women s Gliding Championships in Bulgaria 1987 
 standard class
 15m class

6th European Women s Gliding Championships in Oriol (UDSSR) 1989
 standard class: Marie Kyzivatová (Czechoslovakia)
 15m class: Gisela Weinrich (Germany)

7th European Women s Gliding Championships in Husbands Bosworth (UK) 1991
 standard class: Gisela Weinrich (Germany)
 15m class: Valentina Toporova (Soviet Union)

8th European Women s Gliding Championships in Hosín (CZE)
 standard class: Maika Hohn (Germany)
 15m class champion: Hana Zejdová (Czech Republic)

9th International European Women's Gliding Championships in Marpingen (Germany), 1995
 standard class: Maren Thomas (Germany)
 15m class: Bozena Demczenko (Poland)
 club class champion: Anna Michalak (Poland); runner-up: Rieke Hastert (Germany); third: Halina Rynkiewicz (Poland)

10th International European Women's Gliding Championships in Prievidza Slovakia, 1997
 standard class: Gundula Goeke (Germany)
 15m class: Gisela Weinrich (Germany)
 club class:Claire Luyat (France)

11th European Women's Gliding Championships in Leszno (Poland), 1999 held in conjunction with the 2nd World Class World Championship
 standard class
 15m class
 club class:Claire Luyat (France)

The FAI granted World Championship status to international women's contests in 2001. The 1st World Gliding Championships were held in Pociūnai (Lithuania). However, this decision was made rather late so that it was essentially a European contest. For the results of this and the following women's contests refer to Women's World Gliding Championships.

European Junior Gliding Championships

1st European Junior Gliding Championships in Falköping (Sweden), 1991
 Standard Class Winner: Tomasz Rubaj (Poland), glider: SZD 55
 Club Class Winner: Flemming L. Schneider (Denkmark),

2nd European Junior Gliding Championships in La Roche-sur-Yon (France), 1993
 Standard Class Winner: Lars Ternholt (Denmark), 
 Club Class winner: Yann Mignot (France), glider: Pégase C101

3rd European Junior Gliding Championships in Leszno (Poland), 1995
 Standard Class Winner: Guido Achleitner (Germany),
 Club Class Winner: Frank Hahn (Germany),

4th European Junior Gliding Championships in Musbach (Germany), 1997
 Standard Class Winner: Mario Kiessling (Germany),
 Club Class Winner: Michael Sommer (Germany)

The contests were replaced by the Junior World Gliding Championships in 1999. Due to the COVID-19 pandemic, the calendar was revised to shift the World and European Gliding Championships by one year, additionally reintroducing the European Junior Gliding Championships in 2021.

5th European Junior Gliding Championships in Pociūnai (Lithuania), 2021
 Standard Class Winner: Simon Briel (Germany),
 Club Class Winner: Finn Sleigh (United Kingdom),

European Glider Aerobatic Championships

European Glider Aerobatic Championships are held every two years, so that they alternate with World Glider Aerobatic Championships which are held every two years since 1985. These contests are flown in the unlimited category, only. In 2006, the first European Advanced Glider Aerobatic Championships was held in Bad Frankenhausen in conjunction with the German Glider Championships in the unlimited and advanced category. The second European Advanced Glider Aerobatic Championships were held in conjunction with the 2008 German Glider Aerobatic Championships in Rothenburg–Görlitz (26 July 2008 – 3 August 2008).

1st European Glider Aerobatic Championships

2nd European Glider Aerobatic Championships, Rieti (Italy) 1994

3rd FAI European Glider Aerobatic Championships, Pér (Hungary), 27 June 1996 – 6 July 1996
 Individual results:
 Mikhail Mamistov (Russia), glider: Swift S-1
 Jerzy Makula (Poland), glider: MDM-1 Fox
 Adam Michałowski (Poland), glider: Swift S-1
 Team winners:
 Russia :Mikhail Mamistov (Swift S-1), Sergey Rakhmanin (Swift S-1), Sergei Krikalev (Swift S-1)
 Poland :Jerzy Makula (MDM-1 Fox), Adam Michałowski (Swift S-1), Marek Hernik (MDM-1 Fox)
 Czech Republic : Martin Stáhalík (MDM-1 Fox), Petr Poborský (MDM-1 Fox), Josef Čech (MDM-1 Fox)

4th FAI European Glider Aerobatic Championships, Ostrów Wielkopolski (Poland), 19 July 1998 – 2 August 1998
 Individual results:
 Jerzy Makula (Poland), glider: MDM-1 Fox
 Georgij Kaminski (Russia), glider: Swift S-1
 Adam Michałowski (Poland), glider: Swift S-1
 Team winners:
 Poland : Jerzy Makula (MDM-1 Fox), Adam Michałowski (Swift S-1), Małgorzata Margańska (Swift S-1)
 Russia : Georgij Kaminski (Swift S-1), Valentin Barabanov (Swift S-1), Alexandr Panfierov (Swift S-1)
 Czech Republic : Petr Poborský (MDM-1 Fox), Přemysl Vávra (MDM-1 Fox), Jiří Peprný (MDM-1 Fox)

5th FAI European Glider Aerobatic Championships Salon de Provence (France), 7 August 2000 – 20 August 2000
 Individual results:
 Ferenc Tóth (Hungary)
 Jerzy Makula (Poland)
 Georgij Kaminski (Russia)
 Team winners:
 Poland : Jerzy Makula, Adam Michałowski, Krzysztof Brząkalik
 Hungary : Ferenc Tóth, István Matuz, János Szilágyi
 Russia : Georgij Kaminski, Alexandr Panfierov, Valentin Barabanov

6th FAI European Glider Aerobatic Championships, Pasewalk (Germany) – 16 July 2002 – 26 July 2002
 no official results due to poor weather conditions

7th FAI European Glider Aerobatic Championships, Moravská Třebová (Czech Republic), 6 July 2004 – 18 July 2004
 Individual results:
 Jerzy Makula (Poland)
 Alexandr Panfierov (Russia)
 Ferenc Tóth (Hungary)

8th FAI European Glider Aerobatic Championships, Rybnik (Poland), 19 July 2006 – 29 July 2006
 Individual results:
 Ferenc Tóth (Hungary), glider: Swift S-1
 Jerzy Makula (Poland), glider: Solo-Fox
 Georgij Kaminski (Russia), glider: Swift S-1
 Team winners:
 Hungary : Ferenc Tóth (Swift S-1), János Szilágyi (Swift S-1), Szabolcs Kühtreiber (Swift S-1)
 Russia : Georgij Kaminski (Swift S-1), Igor Plakhsin (Swift S-1), Olga Romanenko (Swift S-1)
 Germany : Eugen Schaal (MDM-1 Fox), Markus Feyerabend (Swift S-1), Olaf Schmidt (Swift S-1)

9th FAI European Glider Aerobatic Championships, Radom (Poland), 7 July 2008 – 17 July 2008
 Individual results:
 Ferenc Tóth (Hungary), glider: Swift S-1
 Erik Piriou (France), glider: Swift S-1
 Markus Feyerabend (Germany), glider: Swift S-1
 Team winners:
 Czech Republic : Přemysl Vávra (Swift S-1), Jan Rozlivka (Swift S-1), Miroslav Červenka (Swift S-1)
 Russia : Alexandr Panfierov (Swift S-1), Georgij Kaminski (Swift S-1), Igor Plakhsin (Swift S-1)
 Germany : Markus Feyerabend (Swift S-1), Olaf Schmidt (Swift S-1), Hans-Georg Resch (Swift S-1)

10th FAI European Glider Aerobatic Championships, Jämijärvi (Finland), 17 July 2010 – 24 July 2010
 Individual results:
 Erik Piriou (France), glider: Swift S-1
 Ferenc Tóth (Hungary), glider: Swift S-1
 Dietmar Poll (Austria), glider: Swift S-1
 Team winners:
 Hungary : Ferenc Tóth (Swift S-1), János Szilágyi (Swift S-1), Szabolcs Kühtreiber (Swift S-1)
 France : Erik Piriou (Swift S-1), Daniel Serres (Swift S-1), Pierre Albertini (Swift S-1)
 Poland : Maciej Pospieszynski (Swift S-1), Jerzy Makula (Solo-Fox), Stanisław Makula (Solo-Fox)

References

Gliding competitions
Aviation competitions and awards
Gliding